The Little Mermaid Pinball is video game developed for Windows by Disney Interactive and published by Disney Online. It was released on July 11, 2005. The game was available in multiple languages, including English, German, French, Italian and Spanish. The was game able to be previewed on a trial basis and then purchased via download through Macrovision's games network distribution partners.

Gameplay 

The game consists of one large playfield split into three sections, with only one on the screen at a time.   It game showcases a variety of sea creatures, including the sea witch, Ursula, who tries to steal the pinball. The game also boasts a whirlpool and coral lanes that light up.

 Ursula's Lair. The lowest section of the playfield. Break the mirror to begin multi-ball.
 Under the Sea. The middle section of the playfield. Trigger the whirlpool to start multi-ball.
 King Triton's Lair. Spin the starfish roulette or spell out Triton to start multi-ball.

References

External links 
The Little Mermaid Pinball on archive.org

Pinball video games
Video games developed in the United States
Windows games
Windows-only games
2005 video games
The Little Mermaid (franchise) video games